Lamalera is a Central Malayo-Polynesian language of the island of Lembata, east of Flores in Indonesia.

References

Flores-Lembata languages
Languages of Indonesia